The Reform Party can refer to a number of current and disbanded political parties of various ideologies.

North America

Canada
Reform Party of Canada, a major political party in Canada from 1987 until 2000 when it became the Canadian Alliance
Reform Party of Alberta (1989–2004)
Reform Party of Alberta (2016–present)
Reform Party of Ontario
Reform Party of British Columbia
Manitoba Reform Party (defunct)
Reform movement (pre-Confederation Canada), Canadian political movement agitating for responsible government

United States
Toleration Party (American Toleration and Reform Party), founded in Connecticut in the 1810s
Reform Party (19th-century Wisconsin), a short-lived coalition of the 1870s
Reform Party of the Hawaiian Kingdom
Reform Party of New York State
Reform Party of the United States of America, founded in 1995 by Ross Perot
Reform Party of Minnesota, supporters of the above, now the Independence Party
American Reform Party, factional offshoot from the Reform Party of the United States, which only endorsed other party candidates
Reform Party of Syria, a United States lobbying organization
Reform Party (Mormon), founded by Joseph Smith in 1844; went defunct that same year

Europe

Baltic States
Estonian Reform Party
Patriotic Party (defunct) of the Polish-Lithuanian Commonwealth, active in the late 18th century
Reform Party (Latvia) (2011–2016)

United Kingdom
Gibraltar Reform Party
Reform Jersey
English Democrats (Reform UK), a small UKIP splinter group active during 2000–2004
Reform UK, the new name for the Brexit Party following the exit of the UK from the European Union

Others
Reform Party (Northern Cyprus)
Reform Party (Iceland) (2016)
Party of Reform (Moldova), now called Liberal Party
Reform Party (Norway)
Reform Party (Norway, 1974) (defunct), active in 1974–75

Africa
Reform Party (Ghana)
Reform Party (Rhodesia)
Reform Party (Kenya)
Reform Party (South Africa)
Reform and Renaissance Party (Egypt)
Egyptian Reform Party
Reform and Development Misruna Party (Egypt)

Asia and Oceania
New Zealand Reform Party (defunct)
Reform Party (Palestine)
Reform Party (Singapore)
Shinui, which means reform in Hebrew, an Israeli party.
Al-Islah (Yemen), which means reform in Arabic, a Yemeni party
Reformers' Party, active in Iran during late Qajar and early Pahlavi dynasty
Reform Party (Northern Mariana Islands)

See also
Reform and Development Party (disambiguation)
Reformist Party (disambiguation)

Political party disambiguation pages